Gordon Zdravko Kljestan (born November 30, 1983 in Huntington Beach, California) is a retired American soccer player.

Career

College and Amateur
Kljestan played one year of college soccer for Cal State Fullerton, prior to transferring to Seton Hall University where he played from 2004 to 2006. Kljestan was a three year starter for the Pirates and was named as a 2006 All-Big East preseason selection and 2005 All-Big East honorable mention.

During his college years, Kljestan also played three seasons for Orange County Blue Star of the USL Premier Development League.

Professional
Kljestan was drafted by the Los Angeles Galaxy with the 10th overall pick in the first round of the 2007 MLS Supplemental Draft. He started in six games for the Galaxy reserve team, logging 513 minutes, but was waived at the end of the season without making a senior start.

In 2007, Kljestan signed with the New Jersey Ironmen of the Major Indoor Soccer League.  He played thirty-two games, scoring two goals.  In 2008, he played in one game for his second USL Premier Development League team, Newark Ironbound Express. On June 7, 2008, he started in a 1-1 draw against the Long Island Rough Riders. He started and played for 68 minutes until the game was called off due to weather.

Kljestan signed with the New York Red Bulls on June 25, 2008 after training with the team for weeks. He played in his first match for the New York the following day in a friendly against Chivas Guadalajara, and made his full professional debut for the Red Bulls on 1 July 2008, in a US Open Cup third round game against Crystal Palace Baltimore. He was waived on November 26, 2008.

He signed with Cleveland City Stars in April 2009 and he played in 22 games.

Kljestan signed with FC Tampa Bay of the USSF Division 2 in April 2010. Appeared in 12 matches, scoring 2 goals as a defender.

Retired from professional soccer in January 2011 and currently works in the Los Angeles Galaxy front office.

Personal
Gordon is the brother of former Chivas USA and current LA Galaxy  and former United States national soccer team midfielder Sacha Kljestan.  Kljestan's father Slavko Klještan, a Bosnian Serb from Sarajevo, Bosnia and Herzegovina, was a professional player playing for Željezničar Sarajevo.

References

External links
Cleveland City Stars bio
MetroFanatic profile
New Jersey Ironmen profile
Seton Hall bio

1983 births
Living people
American people of Serbian descent
American soccer players
Association football midfielders
Cal State Fullerton Titans men's soccer players
Cleveland City Stars players
Jersey Express S.C. players
LA Galaxy draft picks
LA Galaxy non-playing staff
LA Galaxy players
Major Indoor Soccer League (2001–2008) players
New Jersey Ironmen players
New York Red Bulls players
Orange County Blue Star players
Seton Hall Pirates men's soccer players
Soccer players from California
Sportspeople from Huntington Beach, California
Tampa Bay Rowdies players
USL First Division players
USL League Two players
USSF Division 2 Professional League players